George Ward (30 November 1993 – 18 September 2022), better known by the stage name Cherry Valentine, was an English drag queen and mental health nurse who competed in the second series of the television show RuPaul's Drag Race UK and was the subject of the BBC documentary Cherry Valentine: Gypsy Queen and Proud.

Career
Ward, as his father had done, was expected to develop a career as a mechanic. He was the first member of his family to attend university, studying mental health nursing at the University of Cumbria where he was introduced to Manchester's drag scene. After considering several names, he chose the moniker "Cherry Valentine" for his drag alter ego. Ward qualified as a mental health nurse in 2015 and began performing as Cherry Valentine in 2016 while still working as a nurse, working in children's psychiatric intensive care and with adults with Huntington's disease.

In December 2020, Cherry Valentine was announced as one of twelve contestants in the second series of RuPaul's Drag Race UK. In an interview for the show, she said working as a nurse "has put me in that right position where I'm able to understand people a bit more, and if you're a drag queen, you're working with people. By understanding people, you're going the extra mile". When filming for the show was halted during the COVID-19 pandemic, Ward returned to work in National Health Service (NHS) to assist in COVID-19 relief efforts and the UK's deployment of COVID-19 vaccines.

Cherry Valentine was eliminated in the second episode in a challenge to lip-sync to the song "Memory" by Elaine Paige from the musical Cats (1981) against fellow contestant Tayce. In "Queens on Lockdown", a special episode of the series that explores the contestants' lives during the COVID-19 pandemic, Cherry Valentine discussed returning to work in the NHS. Alongside fellow eliminated contestants Joe Black and Asttina Mandella, she appeared in the fifth episode—the first to be filmed post-lockdown—"The RuRuvision Song Contest" for a chance to return to the competition and replace Veronica Green, who was forced to withdraw after testing positive for COVID. The remaining contestants, however, voted for Joe Black to return. Cherry Valentine made her final appearance on the series in the grand finale alongside the other eliminated contestants.

In February 2022, Cherry Valentine, alongside the rest of the series's contestants, embarked on "RuPaul's Drag Race UK: The Official Tour".

Personal life and death
Ward grew up in an English Traveller community in Darlington, County Durham, in the north-east of England, and was the first drag queen of Romani heritage to appear on the Drag Race franchise. Discussing his background on Drag Race UK, Ward said he grew up in a strict environment in which drag was not accepted and as part of the LGBTQIA+ community; he hid his Traveller heritage because he feared he might receive "hate or backlash". Speaking to fellow Drag Race contestant Sister Sister, he said; "Growing up [being gay] did affect me. I don't think I was completely sane at all."

Ward came out to his parents by writing a letter before leaving home for a week, after which his parents individually took him for a drive and talked but did not discuss his sexual orientation after that incident. Ward left home when he was 18, and he returned to the Traveller community for the 2022 documentary Cherry Valentine: Gypsy Queen and Proud. Ward was genderfluid and used he/they pronouns when not in drag.

Ward died on 18 September 2022 at age 28. A coroner’s inquest on 9 February 2023 recorded Ward’s death as a suicide. Following the announcement of his death, numerous Drag Race contestants paid tribute to him; these include fellow second-series contestants Asttina Mandela, A'Whora, Bimini Bon-Boulash, Ellie Diamond, Ginny Lemon, Joe Black, Lawrence Chaney, Sister Sister, Tayce, and Tia Kofi, as well as Priyanka and Sum Ting Wong. RuPaul described Ward as a "bright star and a lovely person" who would "always be in [their] hearts", and Michelle Visage said Ward was "one of a kind with a laugh as big as [his] heart".

Filmography

Television

Music videos

Discography

As featured artist

Stage

Awards and nominations

References 

1993 births
2022 suicides
20th-century English LGBT people
21st-century English LGBT people
Alumni of the University of Cumbria
English drag queens
English nurses
English Romani people
Gay entertainers
Genderfluid people
People with non-binary gender identities
LGBT Romani people
Non-binary drag performers
People from Darlington
Psychiatric nurses
RuPaul's Drag Race UK contestants